Kingdom of the Night is the debut album by Axxis, released in 1989.

Track listing
All songs by Bernard Weiss and Walter Pietsch

 "Living in a World" - 3:53
 "Kingdom of the Night" - 3:50
 "Never Say Never" - 3:41
 "Fire and Ice" - 4:00
 "Young Souls" - 3:16
 "Singing for a Song" - 4:03
 "Love Is Like an Ocean" - 3:24
 "The Moon" - 3:40
 "Tears of the Trees" - 4:10
 "Just One Night" - 3:13
 "Kings Made of Steel" - 3:32
 "Living in a World (Extended Version)" - 5:08

Personnel
Bernhard Weiss: Vocals, Guitars
Walter Pietsch: Vocals, Guitars
Tobias Becker: Keyboards
Werner Kleinhans: Bass
Richard Michalski: Drums, Backing Vocals

With Ava Cimiotti, Frank Pieper: Additional Vocals

References

External links
Official website

1989 debut albums
Axxis albums
EMI Records albums